"Plan B" is a song by American rapper Megan Thee Stallion. She previewed the song during her performance at the Coachella Valley Music and Arts Festival; it was then released a week later on April 22, 2022. It serves as the second single from her second studio album Traumazine.

Background and composition
A week before Coachella, Megan Thee Stallion announced the song in a Twitter post: "I got this song that I recorded and every time I play it for a woman they start jumping and clapping. I think I wanna perform it at Coachella for the first time before I actually drop it." Soon after, she shared a clip of her rapping the song on Twitter. While onstage at Coachella, Megan said the song was "very motherfucking personal to her" and is "to whom the fuck it may concern". The song was also rumored to be titled "Letter to My Ex", but Megan clarified it was not in a Tweet.

"Plan B" sees Megan Thee Stallion rapping over a beat sampling the "Freek'n You" remix by Jodeci featuring Wu-Tang Clan. She bitterly addresses those whom she has been in relationships with: "Still can't believe I used to fuck with ya / Poppin' Plan Bs 'cause I ain't planned to be stuck with ya". Plan B being in reference to levonorgestrel, which prevents pregnancy in emergencies. In the "aggressive, hard-hitting" track, she references infidelity and tells women to love themselves, also delivering boastful lyrics showing her sexual confidence.

Many believed the song was directed toward Canadian rapper Tory Lanez, who shot Megan Thee Stallion in 2020. However, Megan confirmed on Twitter that the song referred to her past relationships instead of a single person in particular.

Charts

Weekly charts

Year-end charts

Certifications

Release history

References

2022 singles
2022 songs
Megan Thee Stallion songs
Songs written by Megan Thee Stallion
Song recordings produced by Yung Berg
300 Entertainment singles
Diss tracks
Songs about infidelity